Darányi is a Hungarian surname. Notable people with the surname include:

Ignác Darányi (1849–1927), Hungarian politician
József Darányi (1905–1990), Hungarian shot putter
Kálmán Darányi (1886–1939), Hungarian politician

Hungarian-language surnames